The Pittsburgh Winter Garden hockey team was an amateur ice hockey team based in Pittsburgh, Pennsylvania. The team received its name from its home arena, the Winter Garden at Exposition Hall, and played only four games, winning one and losing three, in its only season of 1915–16. The Winter Garden team was managed and coached by Arthur Sixsmith and consisted of several players from the defunct Western Pennsylvania Hockey League (WPHL), which was the first openly professional hockey league. Despite the fact that former professional players were on the team, the club remained strictly amateur. Lorne Campbell and Arthur's brother, Garnet Sixsmith, played on the Winter Garden team and were both alumni of the WPHL.

History
Around 1914, public interest in ice skating was growing in Pittsburgh and that interest served was the focus for converting the Main Hall of Exposition Hall into the Winter Garden. Hockey was a growing sport in Pittsburgh and had been played at the Duquesne Gardens, which was located in the city's Oakland neighborhood. However, ice time at the Gardens was scarce while the demand for hockey was growing. In 1915, chiller pipes and concrete were added to the floor of the Main Hall to create an impressive ice surface. The size of the playing surface used for the Exposition's hockey games was  x  and was bigger than today's international size rinks. By comparison, today's National Hockey League rinks measure  x . The increased size wore down visiting opponents and heavily favored the home teams. While the Winter Garden team was formed in late 1915, by Arthur Sixsmith; Roy Schooley, the manager of the Duquesne Gardens, began putting together his "Duquesne Garden hockey team". A feud soon began between the two clubs. The Duquesne and Winter Garden teams each played out-of-town opponents, sometimes on the same night, and in direct competition of one another. 

On January 24 and 25, 1916, the Winter Garden team played a two-game series against the Sudbury All-Stars, who were considered one of the best teams in Canada. The Winter Garden team defeated Sudbury, 2–0, in the first game. During the game, Pittsburgh's "Kewpie" Young collided with Sudbury's Shorty Green, resulting in the loss of several of Young's teeth. Of the opening game, the Sudbury players were reportedly overwhelmed by the size of the Garden's ice surface. However, the Winter Garden team would go on to drop the series' second game to Sudbury, 3–1.

Aside from the two games against Sudbury, the Winter Garden team played only two other games, both losses to a team from Detroit.

Schedule and results
All games were played at the Winter Garden at Exposition Hall, Pittsburgh.

References

Defunct ice hockey teams in Pennsylvania
Defunct Pittsburgh sports teams
Ice hockey clubs established in 1915
Ice hockey clubs disestablished in 1916